The Beach volleyball  competition in the  2009 Asian Youth Games were held at Siloso Beach, Sentosa in Singapore between 1 and 5 July 2009.

Medalists

Medal table

Results

Boys

Preliminary round

Group A

Group B

Group C

Group D

Knockout round

Girls

Preliminary round

Group E

Group F

Group G

Group H

Knockout round

References
 Official site
 Asian Volleyball Confederation

2009 Asian Youth Games events
Asian Youth Games